William Luebke (April 28, 1906 – May 15, 1960) was an American construction worker, woolen mill superintendent, and politician.

Early life and education 
Born in Milwaukee, Wisconsin, Luebke studied in high school and vocational school. He took a summer course at University of Wisconsin.

Career 
Luebke worked as a construction worker and a woolen mill superintendent. From 1941 to 1943, Luebke served in the Wisconsin State Assembly as a Progressive. He served again from 1955 to 1959 as a Democrat.

Death 
Luebke died in his house in West Allis, Wisconsin of a heart attack while still in office.

Notes

1906 births
1960 deaths
Politicians from Milwaukee
University of Wisconsin–Madison alumni
Wisconsin Progressives (1924)
Democratic Party members of the Wisconsin State Assembly
20th-century American politicians